French Valley is a census-designated place located in the French Valley of Riverside County, California. The 2020 United States census reported French Valley's population as 35,280, up from 23,067 at the 2010 census. It became the most populous CDP in Riverside County when Rubidoux was incorporated into Jurupa Valley.

Geography
According to the United States Census Bureau, the CDP covers an area of 10.9 square miles (28.2 km), 99.94% of it land, and 0.06% of it water.

Demographics

At the 2010 census French Valley had a population of 23,067. The racial makeup of French Valley was 14,827 (64.3%) White, 1,828 (7.9%) African American, 229 (1.0%) Native American, 2,672 (11.6%) Asian, 134 (0.6%) Pacific Islander, 1,889 (8.2%) from other races, and 1,488 (6.5%) from two or more races. Hispanic or Latino of any race were 6,318 persons (27.4%).

The census reported that 21,922 people (95.0% of the population) lived in households, 5 (0%) lived in non-institutionalized group quarters, and 1,140 (4.9%) were institutionalized.

There were 6,108 households, 3,709 (60.7%) had children under the age of 18 living in them, 4,473 (73.2%) were opposite-sex married couples living together, 595 (9.7%) had a female householder with no husband present, 294 (4.8%) had a male householder with no wife present.  There were 306 (5.0%) unmarried opposite-sex partnerships, and 48 (0.8%) same-sex married couples or partnerships. 491 households (8.0%) were one person and 92 (1.5%) had someone living alone who was 65 or older. The average household size was 3.59.  There were 5,362 families (87.8% of households); the average family size was 3.77.

The age distribution was 7,776 people (33.7%) under the age of 18, 1,978 people (8.6%) aged 18 to 24, 7,938 people (34.4%) aged 25 to 44, 4,182 people (18.1%) aged 45 to 64, and 1,193 people (5.2%) who were 65 or older.  The median age was 30.5 years. For every 100 females, there were 107.9 males.  For every 100 females age 18 and over, there were 108.3 males.

There were 6,635 housing units at an average density of 608.9 per square mile, of the occupied units 5,060 (82.8%) were owner-occupied and 1,048 (17.2%) were rented. The homeowner vacancy rate was 4.0%; the rental vacancy rate was 7.2%.  17,941 people (77.8% of the population) lived in owner-occupied housing units and 3,981 people (17.3%) lived in rental housing units.

Education
Schools in French Valley are primarily associated with the Temecula Valley Unified School District, although the northwestern portion of French Valley is served by schools operated by the Murrieta Valley Unified School District and the Menifee Union School District.

Elementary schools
 Alamos Elementary School
 French Valley Elementary School
 Lisa J. Mails Elementary School
 Susan LaVorgna Elementary School

Middle schools
 Bella Vista Middle School
 Dorothy McElhinney Middle School

High schools
There are currently no public high schools in French Valley. The closest ones are Chaparral High School in Temecula and Vista Murrieta High School in Murrieta.

Other schools
 Harvest Hill STEAM Academy
 Temecula Preparatory School

Future schools
 French Valley High School
 K-8 STEAM Academy

See also
 French Valley
 French Valley Airport

References

Census-designated places in Riverside County, California
Census-designated places in California